Vladislav Leonidovich Zanadvorov (28 September 1914 – ) was a Soviet writer best known for his World War II poems.

A geologist by profession, Zanadvorov was conscripted into the Red Army in February 1942 and fell in battle near Stalingrad nine months later.

Biography
Zanadvorov was born in 1914 and grew up in his native town of Perm. He attended a technical high school and honed his youthful interest in geology by taking part in several Soviet geological expeditions after his high school graduation in the early 1930s. These expeditions which took him all over the Soviet Union. He enrolled at Perm State University to study geology in 1935 and finished his degree with distinction in 1940.

A member of several literary groups in the 1930s, Zanadvorov published his first poems in a magazine in 1932. His first book, Mednaya Gora (Copper Mountain), a novelette for young readers, was published in 1936. His first poetry collection, Prostora (The Expanse), appeared in 1941.

Zanadvorov's life was cut short by the German invasion of the Soviet Union in World War II. Conscripted in the Red Army in February 1942, he fell in battle while attacking a German machine gun pillbox at a Rostov Oblast village near Stalingrad on 28 November 1942.

Many dozens of Vladislav Zanadvorov's remaining poems were published posthumously in several anthologies first published in the 1940s and 1950s.

References

External links
 Vladislav Zanadvorov in the Perm Encyclopedia 
 Vladislav Zanadvorov in the Ural Historical Encyclopedia 

1914 births
1942 deaths
Writers from Perm, Russia
Soviet geologists
Soviet military personnel killed in World War II
Soviet poets
Soviet male writers
World War II poets